The University of North Carolina at Chapel Hill Music Library contains a collection of approximately 3,500 19th century vocal and instrumental titles of American popular music.     The collection has been digitally scanned and tagged for simple browsing.

External links
 UNC Chapel Hill  Music Library website

References

American popular music